Henry John Norman Paternoster (8 July 1882 – 15 July 1956) was an  Australian rules footballer who played with South Melbourne in the Victorian Football League (VFL).

Notes

External links 

1882 births
1956 deaths
Australian rules footballers from South Australia
Sydney Swans players
South Broken Hill Football Club players